Song Ju-han (born 16 June 1993) is a South Korean footballer who plays as a defender for FC Pocheon in K3 League.

Career
He signed with Daejeon Citizen in 2014. He made his debut in the league match against Suwon FC.

References

External links 

1993 births
Living people
Association football defenders
South Korean footballers
Daejeon Hana Citizen FC players
Gyeongnam FC players
K League 2 players
K League 1 players
K3 League players
Sportspeople from North Jeolla Province